Norkanovo (Norqan) is a rural locality (a village) in Sandugachevsky Selsoviet, Yanaulsky District, Bashkortostan, Russia. The population was 132 as of 2010. There are 2 streets.

Geography 
Norkanovo is located 19 km east of Yanaul (the district's administrative centre) by road. Sandugach is the nearest rural locality.

References 

Rural localities in Yanaulsky District